The 1966 Asian Games, also known as the V Asiad, were a continental multi-sport event that was held from 9 to 20 December 1966, in Bangkok, Thailand. A total of 142 events in 16 sports were contested by athletes during the games. Taiwan and Israel returned to the Asian Games, reversing the decision taken by Indonesia in the previous Asiad to debar the two countries. A total number of 2,500 athletes and officials from 18 countries, were involved in this Asiad.

The 5th Asiad was the first one where women's volleyball was played.

Venues

National Sport Complex
 Suphachalasai Stadium (Opening & Closing ceremonies, Athletics and Football)
 Chantanayingyong Gymnasium (Volleyball)
 Dhephatsadin Stadium (Hockey)
 Nimibutr Indoor Stadium (Basketball)
 Tennis Stadium (Tennis)
 Wisutarom Swimming Pool (Diving, Swimming)

Sport Authority of Thailand Sport Complex (Hua Mark)
 Indoor Stadium (formerly Kittikachorn Indoor Stadium) (Badminton and Boxing)
 Shooting Range (Shooting)
 Velodrome (Cycling)

Chulalongkorn University Sport Complex
 Chula Football Stadium (Football)
 Chula Student Union Hall (Table Tennis)
 Chula Swimming Stadium (Water Polo)

Thammasat University (Thaprachan Centre)
 Thammasat Gymnasium (Volleyball)

Other Venues in Bangkok
 Cultural Hall (Weightlifting)
 Amporn Garden Hall (Wrestling)

Participating nations

 (34)
 (70)
 (43)
 (21)
 (259)
 (257)
 (254)
 (90)
 (296)
 (150)
 (61)
 (42)
 (173)
 (306)
 (103)
 (268)
 (141)
 (host) (307)

Sports

Medal table

Japan led the medal table for the fifth consecutive time, and they gained a new record for the most gold medals in a single Asian Games since 1962 in Jakarta. The top ten ranked NOCs at these Games are listed below. The host nation, Thailand, is highlighted.

References
https://eresources.nlb.gov.sg/newspapers/Digitised/Article/straitstimes19661221-1.2.156

 
Asian Games
Asian Games
Asian Games
Asian Games
Summer
Asian Games by year
Asian Games